The Rainhill trials was an important competition run from the 6 to 14 October 1829, to test George Stephenson's argument that locomotives would have the best motive power for the then nearly-completed Liverpool and Manchester Railway (L&MR). Ten locomotives were entered, of which five were able to compete, running along a  length of level track at Rainhill, in Lancashire (now Merseyside).

Stephenson's Rocket was the only locomotive to complete the trials, and was declared the winner. The directors of the L&MR accepted that locomotives should operate services on their new line, and George and Robert Stephenson were given the contract to produce locomotives for the railway.

Background
The directors of the Liverpool and Manchester Railway had originally intended to use stationary steam engines to haul trains along the railway using cables. They had appointed George Stephenson as their engineer of the line in 1826, and he strongly advocated for the use of steam locomotives instead. As the railway was approaching completion, the directors decided to hold a competition to decide whether locomotives could be used to pull the trains; these became the Rainhill trials. A prize of £500 (equal to £ today) was offered to the winner of the trials.

Three notable engineers were selected as judges: John Urpeth Rastrick, a locomotive engineer of Stourbridge, Nicholas Wood, a mining engineer from Killingworth with considerable locomotive design experience, and John Kennedy, a Manchester cotton spinner and a major proponent of the railway.

Rules 
The L&MR company set the rules for the trials. The rules went through several revisions; the final set, under which the competition was held, was:

Entries 
Ten locomotives were officially entered for the trials, but on the day the competition began – 6 October 1829 – only five locomotives were available to run:

Cycloped, a horse-powered locomotive built by Thomas Shaw Brandreth, was disqualified for not being steam powered.
Novelty, the world's first tank locomotive, built by John Ericsson and John Braithwaite.
Perseverance, a Vertical boilered locomotive, built by Timothy Burstall.
Rocket, designed by George and Robert Stephenson; built by Robert Stephenson and Company.
Sans Pareil, built by Timothy Hackworth.

Competition 
The locomotives were to run at Kenrick's Cross, on the mile east from the Manchester side of Rainhill Bridge. Two or three locomotives ran each day, and several tests for each locomotive were performed over the course of six days. Between 10,000 and 15,000 people turned up to watch the trials and bands provided musical entertainment on both days.

Cycloped was the first to drop out of the competition. It used a horse walking on a drive belt for power and was withdrawn after an accident caused the horse to burst through the floor of the engine.

The next locomotive to retire was Perseverance, which was damaged in transit to the competition. Burstall spent the first five days of the trials repairing his locomotive, and though it ran on the sixth day, it failed to reach the required  speed and was withdrawn from the trial. It was granted a £25 consolation prize (equal to £ today).

Sans Pareil nearly completed the trials, though at first there was some doubt as to whether it would be allowed to compete as it was  overweight. However, it did eventually complete eight trips before cracking a cylinder. Despite the failure it was purchased by the L&MR, where it ran for two years before being leased to the Bolton and Leigh Railway.

The last locomotive to drop out was Novelty. In contrast to Cycloped, it used advanced technology for 1829 and was lighter and considerably faster than the other locomotives in the competition. It was the crowd favourite and reached a then-astonishing  on the first day of competition. It later suffered damage to a boiler pipe which could not be fixed properly on site. Nevertheless, it ran the next day and reached  before the repaired pipe failed and damaged the engine severely enough that it had to be withdrawn.

The Rocket was the only locomotive that completed the trials. It averaged  and achieved a top speed of ) hauling 13 tons, and was declared the winner of the £500 prize (equal to £ today). The Stephensons were given the contract to produce locomotives for the L&MR.

The Times carried a full report of the trials on 12 October 1829 from which the following extract are taken:

Additional trials

Re-enactments

Rocket 150 

In May 1980 the Rocket 150 celebration was held to mark the 150th Anniversary of the opening of the Liverpool and Manchester Railway and the trials the year before.

A replica of Novelty was built for the event, which was also attended by replicas of Sans Pareil and Rocket (plus coach). On the first day of the Trials, disaster struck. The Rocket, to the dismay of the many visitors, failed to run. It came off the rails as it was exiting the Bold Colliery sidings and buckled the rim of one of its large drive wheels. That evening, senior staff from a St Helens road transport company met a former colleague of the builder of the Rocket replica, at a Liverpool Hotel and agreed that, in the early hours of the following morning, they would urgently manufacture some steel parts (wedges) in their nearby workshops, to fix the bent drive wheel before the second day's parade commenced. At the same time, BR agreed to put a team of staff into the sidings at Bold to "straighten" the bent rails. Both activities were achieved on time and the Rocket ran successfully on the following two days of the Trials, though Sans Pareil was pushed by Lion and Novelty was on a wagon hauled by LMS Stanier Class 5 4-6-0 5000. As the line was then not electrified, the Advanced Passenger Train was also pushed, but by the latest diesel, Class 56, 077.

The 'Grand Cavalcade' on each of the three days featured up to 40 steam and diesel locomotives and other examples of modern traction, including:
 Lion, at the time of Rocket 150 the oldest operable steam locomotive in existence(The British-built US locomotive John Bull, seven years older, was steamed again in 1981)
 Flying Scotsman No. 4472
 LMS 4-6-0 Jubilee class No. 5690 Leander
 Sir Nigel Gresley No. 4498
 Green Arrow No. 4771
 GWR 0-6-0 No. 3205
 LMS Class 4 MT 2-6-0 No. 43106
 BR 92220 Evening Star, the last steam locomotive to be built by British Railways
 LMS 4-6-2 Princess Elizabeth No. 6201

Two Class 86 locomotives 86214 Sans Pareil and 86235 Novelty were painted in a variation of the Large Logo Rail Blue livery where the BR logo was replaced by Rocket 150 motif on a yellow background.

2002 Restaging 

In a recent (2002) restaging of the Rainhill trials using replica engines, neither Sans Pareil (11 out of 20 runs) nor Novelty (10 out of 20 runs) completed the course. In calculating the speeds and fuel efficiencies, it was found that Rocket would still have won, as its relatively modern technology made it a much more reliable locomotive than the others. Novelty almost matched it in terms of efficiency, but its firebox design caused it to gradually slow to a halt due to a buildup of molten ash (called "clinker") cutting off the air supply. The restaged trials were run over the Llangollen Railway, Wales, and were the subject of a 2003 BBC Timewatch documentary.

This restaging should not be taken as accurate as there were major compromises made for television and because of the differences in crew experience, the fuel used, the modifications made to the replicas for modern safety rules, modern materials and construction methods, and following operating experience. Sensible comparisons were made between the engines only after calculations took into account the differences.

The replicas had major differences from the 1829 originals.

References

Notes

Footnotes

Sources

External links 

Rocket and its Rivals Details of 2003 Timewatch episode at Highbeam

Historic transport in Merseyside
History of rail transport in the United Kingdom
1829 in rail transport
1829 in England
October 1829 events